Marquez Phillips Pope (born October 29, 1970 in Nashville, Tennessee) is a former professional American football player who was drafted by the San Diego Chargers in the 2nd round (33rd overall) of the 1992 NFL Draft. A 5'11" cornerback-safety from Fresno State University, Pope played for 5 teams in 10 NFL seasons from 1992 to 2001. His best year as a pro came during the 1996 season for the San Francisco 49ers, intercepting 6 passes with 1 touchdown. During his pro career, Pope was known to be among the hardest hitters in the NFL. 

Pope is the only National Football League player in history to play on all California teams (San Diego, Los Angeles, San Francisco, Oakland). He also inspired the Marquez Pope rule, which states that a fumble recovered by a defensive player will be spotted at the spot of the recovery, not where the player's momentum leads him. This occurred because in 2000, Pope recovered a fumble by Seahawk Ricky Watters, but a rainy field at Husky Stadium in Seattle caused him to slide into his own end zone with the ball, which led to a safety for the Seahawks.

1970 births
Living people
Players of American football from Nashville, Tennessee
American football safeties
Fresno State Bulldogs football players
San Diego Chargers players
Los Angeles Rams players
San Francisco 49ers players
Cleveland Browns players
Oakland Raiders players
Long Beach Polytechnic High School alumni